Tachëbrun ("brownspot") is the warhorse of Ganelon, the treacherous paladin in the French epic, The Song of Roland. Tachëbrun is mentioned in laisse 27 of the poem.

References

Matter of France
Individual warhorses
Fictional horses